Club Deportivo Nueva Concepción  is a Salvadoran professional football club based in Nueva Concepción, Chalatenango,  El Salvador.

Nueva Concepcion